These are the 1973 Five Nations Championship squads:

England

Head coach: John Elders

 Fran Cotton
 Dick Cowman
 Sam Doble
 David Duckham
 Geoff Evans
 Tony Jorden
 Peter Larter
 Alan Morley
 Tony Neary
 Peter Preece
 John Pullin (c.)
 Chris Ralston
 Andy Ripley
 Steve Smith
 Peter Squires
 Stack Stevens
 Roger Uttley
 Peter Warfield
 John Watkins
 Jan Webster

France

Head coach: Jean Desclaux

 Jean-Michel Aguirre
 Richard Astre
 Jean-Louis Azarete
 Christian Badin
 Max Barrau
 Jean-Pierre Bastiat
 René Benesis
 Roland Bertranne
 Pierre Biemouret
 Roger Bourgarel
 Jack Cantoni
 Elie Cester
 André Darrieussecq
 Claude Dourthe
 Michel Droitecourt
 Alain Esteve
 Jean Iracabal
 André Lubrano
 Jean-Pierre Lux
 Jo Maso
 Michel Pebeyre
 Jean-François Phliponeau
 Jean-Pierre Romeu
 Olivier Saisset
 Walter Spanghero (c.)
 Jean Trillo
 Armand Vaquerin

Ireland

Head coach: Syd Millar

 James Buckley
 Roger Clegg
 Seamus Dennison
 Tony Ensor
 Mike Gibson
 Tom Grace
 Ken Kennedy
 Tom Kiernan (c.)*
 Sean Lynch
 Kevin Mays
 Willie John McBride (c.)
 Barry McGann
 Stewart McKinney
 Ray McLoughlin
 Arthur McMaster
 Richard Milliken
 Mick Molloy
 John Moloney
 Terry Moore
 Michael Quinn
 Fergus Slattery

Scotland

Head coach: Bill Dickinson

 Peter Brown (c.)
 Hamish Bryce
 Sandy Carmichael
 Bobby Clark
 Ian Forsyth
 Andy Irvine
 Wilson Lauder
 Alan Lawson
 Nairn MacEwan
 Ian McGeechan
 Alastair McHarg
 Ian McLauchlan
 Jock Millican
 Dougie Morgan
 Jim Renwick
 David Shedden
 Billy Steele
 Gordon Strachan
 Colin Telfer
 Ronald Wright

Wales

Head coach: Clive Rowlands

 Phil Bennett
 Roy Bergiers
 John Bevan
 Tommy David
 Gerald Davies
 Mervyn Davies
 Gareth Edwards
 Arthur Lewis (c.)
 Phil Llewellyn
 John Lloyd
 Dai Morris
 Derek Quinnell
 Jim Shanklin
 Glyn Shaw
 John Taylor
 Delme Thomas
 J. J. Williams
 J. P. R. Williams
 Jeff Young

External links
1973 Five Nations Championship at ESPN

Six Nations Championship squads